Si mian chu ge is a Chinese idiom which literally means "Chu song from four sides".

It may refers to:
 A tactic employed in the Battle of Gaixia, from which the idiom originated
 Shimensoka, a 1985 demo tape by Japanese band Kamaitachi
 An episode in a 2004 Hong Kong TV series The Conqueror's Story
 "Sì Miàn Chǔ Gē" (song), a 2005 song by Jay Chou from album November's Chopin